Tarnowo  is a village in the administrative district of Gmina Suchań located within Stargard County, West Pomeranian Voivodeship in north-western Poland.

For the history of the region, see History of Pomerania.

The village has a population of 300.

References

Tarnowo